"Definitivamente" (in English: "Definitely") is a song by Puerto Rican rapper and singer Daddy Yankee and Panamanian singer Sech. The track peaked at number 15 on the US Billboard Hot Latin Songs chart.

Charts

Weekly charts

Year-end charts

Certifications

See also
List of Billboard number-one Latin songs of 2020

References 

Daddy Yankee songs
2020 singles
2020 songs
Songs written by Daddy Yankee
Spanish-language songs
Songs written by Dimelo Flow
Sech (singer) songs